is a former Japanese actress and stuntwoman. She is known for her performance as Annie, the title character's sidekick in the tokusatsu television series Uchuu Keiji Shaiderand as Hellen/Hellvira, the protagonist's sister in Jikuu Senshi Spielban. She retired from acting in 1998, but briefly reprised her role as older Annie in the 2014 film Space Sheriff: THE NEXT GENERATION.

Works

Film
 Space Sheriff Shaider: The Movie (1984), as Annie
 Space Sheriff Shaider: Pursuit! Shigi Shigi Abduction Plan (1984), as Annie
 Hissatsu 4: Urami Harashimasu (Sure-Fire Death 4: We Will Avenge You) (1987)
 Oazuke (1990), as Woman Warrior
 Angel Target (1991)
 Kamen Rider ZO (1993)
 Captive (1994)
 Supernatural Woman Legend Seiraine 4 (1996)
 Space Sheriff: THE NEXT GENERATION (2014)

TV
 Uchuu Keiji Shaider (Space Sheriff Shaider) (1984–1985), as Annie
 Hissatsu Shigotonin V (1985)
 Jikuu Senshi Spielban (1986–1987), as Helen/Hellvira/Lady Helen

External links
 

1964 births
Japanese film actresses
Living people
Actresses from Kanagawa Prefecture